Hypotermes obscuriceps, is a species of termite of the genus Hypotermes. It is native to India, Sri Lanka and Vietnam. It constructs a termitaria and is a pest of tea.

References

External links
Semiochemicals of Hypotermes obscuriceps
Termites on Ceylon tea estates
Termites (Isoptera) in forest ecosystems of Cat Tien National Park (Southern Vietnam)
 

Termites
Insects described in 1902
Insects of India